Smelley is a surname. Notable people with the surname include: 

 Brad Smelley (born 1989), American football player 
 Chris Smelley (born 1986), American football and baseball player

See also
 Smelly (disambiguation)